Ni Yide (1901–1970) was a Chinese modernist painter, writer and art critic.

Artistic career
He graduated in 1922 from the earliest training ground for modern Western art in China, the Shanghai Art School. He became a professor at the Shanghai Art Academy upon his graduation. He continued his studies in Western art and art history in Tokyo at the Kubwata Painting school under Fujishima Takeji. In 1927 Ni returned to China to protest the Japanese military incursion into Shandong. There, he taught at Gangzhou Municipal Art School, then at the Wuchang Art Academy in Hubei. By 1930, he was an art critic, theorist, and creative writer, as well as an oil painter. In 1931 Ni, Pang Xunqin (1906–1985), and five other modernist painters formed the Storm society to promote modern Western art's influence on Chinese art. Ni Yide helped write the group's manifesto.

The Storm Society wanted to be unrestrained by past conventions in art such as limitations by nature. They said that art is not a slave of religion or literature. The storm society exhibited works inspired by European styles such as Fauvism, Cubism, symbolism, expressionism, futurism, abstractionism and surrealism. Their works were featured in Shanghai newspapers and magazines such as Liangyou, Meishije and Shidai.

Ni was also a member of the Muse society at the Shanghai Art Academy. They published l'Art Journal, which provided a venue for its manifesto and most of its exhibition news. One of his paintings, ‘'Summer’' (1932) was  cubist-inspired. In 1941, Ni set up Nitian Studio in Chongqing.

On December 8, 1942, the day after the Pearl Harbor attacks, Japanese encroachment caused the 10 members of the Storm Society to flee south. In 1944 he became a professor at NAA in Chongqing. In 1945 Ni Yide, Din Yangyong (1902-1978), and a few other artists exhibited their works at the Chinese Modern painting exhibition (Zhongguo Xiandai huihan zhan) organized by Zao Wouki (1921-2013) in Chongqing. After World War II, Yide became part of the nine person art society in Shanghai. In 1949, Ni became a professor and vice president of ZAFA (Zhejang Academy of Fine Arts). In 1953, Ni transferred to teach at CAFA (Central Academy of Fine Arts) China. In 1955, Ni became a director of the editing department of Meishu. In 1961 Ni set up a studio in ZAFA, Hangzhou.

Writing career
As a writer, Ni Yide used his considerable literary skills to defend stylistic innovation and personal creativity as the essentials for a modern art in modern China. In the 2nd national art exhibition of China, Ni Yide criticized the judges for their conservative bias, and dismissed  "official art" with the argument that in France real progress always came outside of the government salon. Ni Yide wrote an article defending Qui Ti (1906-1958), a Storm society member who received criticism from realists for a still life of flowers she painted. He wrote an article on Pan Tianshou’s (1897-1971) bird and flower landscapes where he described ‘Bathed in Dew’ as poetical and ‘After the Rain’ where he mentions for example, “...the crimson flowers with their stately leaves appear pure and noble, lovely and gentle and above all lyrical in their beauty”. He uses strong imagery. According to Yide “ ...If we want to exhibit our national heritage, I believe, landscape painting is the most suitable subject. Chinese landscapes in every place possess indigenous Chinese traits.

References 

1901 births
1970 deaths
20th-century Chinese painters
20th-century Chinese writers
Modernism
Modernisme painters
Chinese painters
Chinese writers
Chinese art critics